Edificio Oliver in Arecibo, Puerto Rico was built in 1914. The building houses government offices for the municipality of Arecibo.

A Beaux Arts-style building, it was the first building made of reinforced concrete in the Arecibo area.

It is located in the town center on the location of the former "King's House", the military garrison building built by the Spanish government in 1765.  After 1868 that building became a courthouse, a police headquarters, and a public school then was demolished in 1913. The  was built soon after in the corner location and was used both as a residence and for commercial purposes. It served also served as a foreign consulate.

Edificio Oliver was listed on the National Register of Historic Places in 1986.

References

 

Government buildings on the National Register of Historic Places in Puerto Rico
Beaux-Arts architecture in Puerto Rico
Government buildings completed in 1914
National Register of Historic Places in Arecibo, Puerto Rico
1914 establishments in Puerto Rico